Neopelma is a genus of bird in the family Pipridae.

Etymology 
Neopelma:  neos “new, different”; πελμα pelma, πελματος pelmatos “sole of the foot”.

Species 
It contains the following species:

References 

 
Bird genera
Taxa named by Philip Sclater
Taxonomy articles created by Polbot